The 2015 Tour of Flanders was the 99th edition of the Tour of Flanders one-day cycling race. It took place on 5 April and was the eighth race of the 2015 UCI World Tour. The race was one of the cobbled classics and was the second of the cycling monuments on the 2015 calendar. The 2014 champion was Fabian Cancellara; he was not able to defend his title after breaking two vertebrae in a crash at E3 Harelbeke.

The race was initially dominated by a breakaway group of up to seven riders before the favourites in the chasing group started to attack on the climb of the Taaienberg,  from the finish. Eventually, Alexander Kristoff and Niki Terpstra broke free and contested the victory in a two-man sprint, won by Kristoff, who became the first Norwegian to win the race. Greg Van Avermaet finished third.

Route
The route of the 2015 edition of the race was only slightly adjusted from that of the 2014 edition, with two climbs added to the route in the first , the Tiegemberg and the Berendries. The race started in the Belgian city of Bruges, in the Grote Markt, with a  neutral zone. The racing began after the riders passed through Loppen, on the outskirts of Brugge. The first part of the route was a  route south to the city of Kortrijk, passing through Zwevezele, Ardooie and Izegem. This part of the route was almost entirely flat. After Kortrijk, the route turned east towards the region known as the Flemish Ardennes. The final  were kept from the 2014 edition, with the toughest part of the race starting at the steep Koppenberg. Several climbs needed to be tackled more than once, as the route took two laps of a circuit. These included the Oude Kwaremont, which was ridden three times, first after  as the second climb of the day and the Paterberg, which was featured twice.

Teams
As the Tour of Flanders was a UCI World Tour event, all 17 UCI WorldTeams were invited automatically and were obliged to send a squad. Eight Professional Continental teams received wildcard invitations.

Pre-race favourites
The field of the race was marked by the absence of defending champion Fabian Cancellara and former winner Tom Boonen, both ruled out by crashes earlier in the season. Several riders were named as potential favourites for the victory, among them Geraint Thomas, who came into the race after a victory at E3 Harelbeke and a third-place finish at Gent–Wevelgem just a few days before. In the absence of Cancellara, 's squad was led by Stijn Devolder, the only former winner in the peloton, although he was not considered to have the best chances. 's squad featured Niki Terpstra, Zdeněk Štybar, and Stijn Vandenbergh, all of whom were considered serious contenders.  was led by Alexander Kristoff and Luca Paolini, the latter of which had proven his good form by winning Gent–Wevelgem earlier in the week, but had declared to work for Kristoff for this race. Other possible contenders included Milan–San Remo winner John Degenkolb and Peter Sagan, although Sagan's form had been called into question prior to the race. In addition, commentators named Greg Van Avermaet, Sep Vanmarcke, Lars Boom, Filippo Pozzato, Jürgen Roelandts, Jens Debusschere (both ), and Sylvain Chavanel among the high number of possible contenders. Barry Ryan of Cyclingnews.com declared the race "wide open and [...] a nightmare to predict".

Race report

The race started with a small delay caused by a farmers' strike. When racing got under way, five riders broke free of the pack after : Jesse Sergent, Damien Gaudin, Ralf Matzka, Matt Brammeier, and Dylan Groenewegen, while Clément Venturini was briefly in the front group as well before dropping back. Lars Bak and Marco Frapporti were able to bridge the gap to the leaders, creating a group of seven at the front. After  of racing, the leaders were about seven minutes clear of the peloton, but the gap started to come down once the riders reached the first climbs.

There were several attacks from the main group when it navigated the area around Oudenaarde, with André Greipel featuring in all of them, to no avail. Just before the cobble section of the Haaghoek, a neutral car by supplier Shimano tried to overtake the leading group and hit Sergent, who fell and had to withdraw with a broken collarbone, which later required surgery. With the lead group now down to six riders, they led the main field by three minutes, with  leading the chase, after their rider Bradley Wiggins had recovered from an earlier crash. Another incident involving a car by Shimano occurred a little later when it crashed into the back of a  team car, which in turn brought down rider Sébastien Chavanel, forcing him to abandon as well.

On the Kaperij, the tenth climb, Bak and Gaudin were able to break free from their group. On the second ascent of the Oude Kwaremont, Greipel again unsuccessfully attacked, before the main field reached the breakaway at the top of the climb. On the Koppenberg, Greipel again attacked and an increase in tempo caused Wiggins and other riders to lose contact. At the front, Geraint Thomas and Stijn Devolder led the chase to bring back Greipel. Once they reached him, Alexey Lutsenko was on the attack after the climb, leading at a maximum of half a minute.

At the climb of the Taaienberg,  from the finish, the favourites came into play. Niki Terpstra was the first to move, with Greg Van Avermaet following after crossing the top, soon followed by a larger group. On the third and final lap of the course, Lutsenko attacked the 26-rider strong group again, joined by Van Avermaet and Nelson Oliveira. They were caught before the Kruisberg, soon followed by an attack by Terpstra and Alexander Kristoff. The two created a thirty-second lead and held it to the finish, even with a counter-attack from Van Avermaet and Peter Sagan late on. Terpstra did not contribute to the pace making over the last kilometre, trying to use Kristoff's slipstream to win a sprint. This proved unsuccessful however, as Kristoff took the second monument victory of his career, outsprinting Terpstra to the line. He became the first Norwegian to win the race.

Post-race
Kristoff was delighted with his win, saying: "I'm really happy to win, it's a really good feeling [...] My family is here today, and it was a big dream and my big goal this season and I managed to do it." On his run-in to the finish line with Terpstra, he commented: "At the end, I came with Niki, and he didn't really want to work with me, but I understand that. In the end I could still beat him." Geraint Thomas was disappointed with his performance, tweeting after the race that he "just lacked the legs of last weekend", referring to his E3 Harelbeke victory.

The magazine Cycling Weekly commented on the race by criticising the route as "more attritional [...] than it is tactical", citing the lack of attacks and the teams' reluctance to send riders into break-aways. Reporter Stephen Puddicombe also criticised Niki Terpstra for not attacking Kristoff before the finish, writing: "Did Terpstra really believe he had any hope of winning the two-man sprint against one of the quickest finishers in the world?"

Results

References

External links

 

Tour of Flanders
Tour of Flanders
Tour of Flanders